The March 1949 Syrian coup d'état was a bloodless coup d'état that took place on 30 March, and was the first military coup in modern Syrian history which overthrew the country's democratically elected government. It was led by the Syrian Army chief of staff, Husni al-Za'im, who became President of Syria on 11 April 1949. Among the officers that assisted al-Za'im's takeover were Sami al-Hinnawi and Adib al-Shishakli, both of whom in sequence would later also become military leaders of the country. The president, Shukri al-Quwatli, was accused of purchasing inferior arms for the Syrian Army and poor leadership. He was briefly imprisoned, but then released into exile in Egypt. Syria's legislature, then called the House of Representatives, was dissolved. al-Za'im also imprisoned many political leaders, such as Munir al-Ajlani, whom he accused of conspiring to overthrow the republic.

The coup
As recounted by the British military attaché in Syria, Za'im began plotting a coup two years in advance, starting in March 1947. On March 29, 1949, chief of staff Za'im provided four of his senior officers with instructions outlining their roles in the coup; the officers were told to wait until midnight to view the instructions, and to do so in complete privacy. The coup commenced at 2:30 a.m. on March 30, and proved to be "a masterpiece of military planning, bloodless apart from the deaths of three bodyguards attached to a government minister." Quwatli, ill with "a gastric ulcer and heart complaint," was arrested in hospital by one of six military units that ferreted through Damascus, systematically capturing key government buildings. The Syrian national anthem, and a message from Za'im announcing the change in government, began playing over the radio near dawn.

Political context and allegations of U.S. involvement
There are "highly controversial" allegations that the American legation in Syria—headed by James Hugh Keeley, Jr.—and the Central Intelligence Agency (CIA) engineered the coup. Assistant military attaché (and undercover CIA officer) Stephen J. Meade, who became intimately acquainted with Colonel Za'im several weeks prior to the coup and was considered Za'im's "principal Western confidant" during Za'im's brief time in power, has been described as the coup's architect—along with the CIA's Damascus station chief, Miles Copeland Jr. Copeland later authored several books with "extraordinarily detailed accounts of CIA operations in, among other countries, Syria, Egypt, and Iran," considered "one of the most revelatory set of writings by a former U.S. intelligence officer ever published." However, Copeland's memoirs have a strong literary quality and contain many embellishments, making it difficult to gauge the historical accuracy of the events he describes. Moreover, Copeland's account of the Syrian coup in his 1989 autobiography The Game Player: Confessions of the CIA's Original Political Operative contradicts the earlier version presented in his 1969 The Game of Nations: The Amorality of Power Politics.

In The Game of Nations, Copeland suggested that Syria—as the first former colony in the Arab world to achieve complete political independence from Europe—was perceived in Washington as a test case for America's "capacity for exerting a democratizing influence on Arab countries." According to Copeland, the CIA attempted to "police" the July 1947 Syrian national elections, which were marred by fraud, sectarianism, and interference by neighboring Iraq and Transjordan. When these elections "produced a weak, minority government" under Quwatli—the stability of which was called into question by Syria's defeat in the 1948 Arab–Israeli War—Keeley and other U.S. officials became concerned "that Syria was on the verge of complete collapse," which could have empowered the Syrian Communist Party or other "radicals" (such as the Ba'ath Party and the Muslim Brotherhood). As a result, Keeley became amenable to a military coup "as a way of safeguarding ... the long-term prospects of democracy in the country." At Keeley's behest, Copeland wrote, Meade "systematically developed a friendship with Za'im ... suggested to him the idea of a coup d'état, advised him how to go about it, and guided him through the intricate preparations in laying the groundwork for it."

Available evidence, however, suggests that Za'im was in little need of prodding from the U.S. Recall that, per the British military attaché, Za'im had been contemplating a coup since March 1947—over a year before he was introduced to Meade on November 30, 1948. Shortly before the coup, Za'im tried to win Western sympathy by producing a list of individuals, including Keeley, that were supposedly "communist assassination targets," but U.S. officials were skeptical. While Za'im directly informed Meade of the upcoming coup on March 3 and March 7, the U.S. was not the only foreign power apprised: Za'im notified British officials around the same time. In his conversations with Meade, Za'im outlined his progressive political program for Syria (including land reform) as well as the communist threat, concluding "[there is] only way to start the Syrian people along the road to progress and democracy: With the whip." Za'im struck a different tone in his conversations with the British, citing his desire to establish friendlier ties with Britain's major allies in the area—Iraq and Transjordan. In The Game Player, Copeland provided new details on the American assistance to Za'im's plan, expounding that Meade identified specific installations that had to be captured to ensure the coup's success. However, Copeland also acknowledged that Za'im had initiated the plot on his own: "It was Husni's show all the way."

Douglas Little notes that U.S. assistant secretary of state George C. McGhee visited Damascus in March, "ostensibly to discuss resettling Palestinian refugees but possibly to authorize U.S. support for Za'im." In contrast, Andrew Rathmell describes this hypothesis as "purely speculative."

An overarching US policy objective in Syria at the time was allowing the construction of the Trans-Arabian Pipeline, which had been held up in the Syrian parliament. Za'im approved the "Tapline" project on May 16.

Armistice with Israel
Armistice talks with Israel to end hostilities of the 1948 war started in April 1949, after armistice agreements had already been concluded by the other Arab countries. On 20 July 1949 Syria signed the Israel-Syria Armistice Agreement to formally end hostilities along their border. Under the agreement, Syria withdrew its forces from most of the territories of the former Mandate Palestine that it controlled west of the international border, which became a demilitarized zone. In 1948, there were approximately 30,000 Jews in Syria. Following the coup, the Za'im administration permitted the emigration of large numbers of Syrian Jews, and 5,000 left for Israel.

Prime Minister Muhsin al-Barazi was given the task of conducting secret negotiations with Israel for a peace treaty between the two countries, and to discuss a possible summit between Israeli Prime Minister David Ben-Gurion and al-Zaim. The talks reached advanced levels and Israeli Foreign Minister Moshe Sharett contacted al-Barazi on 6 August 1949 to discuss a date for formal peace talks.

Rebellion
Al-Za'im inspired rebellion among his officers by betraying Antoun Saadeh, the founder and president of the Syrian Social Nationalist Party (SSNP). Saadeh had pledged to set up a friendly government in Lebanon, but on 8 July al-Za'im abducted Saadeh and handed him over to the Lebanese authorities, who tried him for treason and executed him on the same day.

Presidency ended
Al-Za'im's short-lived presidency ended on 14 August 1949 in a military coup staged by Sami al-Hinnawi, along with several other SSNP officers, who promptly executed al-Za'im and al-Barazi, and installed Hashim al-Atassi as president. Another military coup took place in December, the third of that year, this time led by Adib Shishakli, who kept al-Atassi as president until 3 December 1951. al-Hinnawi was murdered on 31 October 1950 by Hersho al-Barazi, a cousin of Muhsin al-Barazi.

See also
1954 Syrian coup d'état
1963 Syrian coup d'état
1966 Syrian coup d'état
CIA activities in Syria

Bibliography

References

Conflicts in 1949
1949 in Syria
1949 3
1940s coups d'état and coup attempts
Syria–United States relations